The Girls' Doubles tournament of the 2018 European Junior Badminton Championships was held from September 11-16. Swedish Doubles Emma Karlsson and Johanna Magnusson clinched this title in the last edition. Danish Amalie Magelund / Freja Ravn leads the seedings this year.

Seeded

 Amalie Magelund / Freja Ravn (finals)
 Bengisu Ercetin / Nazlican Inci (champions)
 Maria Delcheva /  Petra Polanc (third round)
 Ioana Grecea / Maria Alexandra Dutu (third round)
 Vivien Sandorhazi /  Tereza Svabikova (first round)
 Anastasiya Prozorova / Valeriya Rudakova (semi-finals)
 Milou Lugters / Alyssa Tirtosentono (first round)
 Elena Andreu / Ana Carbon (quarter-finals)

Draw

Finals

Top Half

Section 1

Section 2

Section 3

Section 4

Bottom Half

Section 5

Section 6

Section 7

Section 8

References

External links 
Main Draw

European Junior Badminton Championships